NDR Kultur Sachbuchpreis is a literary prize of Germany.

German literary awards